Wiseblood may refer to:

 Wiseblood (band), an electronic noise-rock band
 Wiseblood (Corrosion of Conformity album), 1996
 Wiseblood (King Swamp album), 1990

Wise Blood may refer to:
 Wise Blood, a 1952 novel by Flannery O'Connor
 Wise Blood (film), a 1979 film by John Huston
 Wise Blood (musician), an electronic musician

See also
 Weyes Blood, musician